Boasting or bragging is speaking with excessive pride and self-satisfaction about one's achievements, possessions, or abilities.

Boasting occurs when someone feels a sense of satisfaction or when someone feels that whatever occurred proves their superiority and is recounting accomplishments so that others will feel admiration or envy.

Individuals construct an image of themselves, a personal identity, and present themselves in a manner that is consistent with that image. Theodore Millon theorized that in self-presentation, individuals seek to balance boasting against discrediting themselves with excessive self-promotion or being caught blatantly misrepresenting themselves. Studies show that people often have a limited ability to perceive how their efforts at self-presentation are actually impacting their acceptance and likeability by others.

Forms of bragging 
Although a brag can be as straightforward as a simple claim to riches or greatness, it often assumes a variety of more subtle forms in order to shield the speaker from any opprobrium they might otherwise receive for transgressing the social norms of humility. The most popular of these forms is the humblebrag, a term coined by comedian Harris Wittels, whereby the brag is masked in a complaint. For example, "Dating websites are so much work. Every time I log in, I have like a hundred new messages."

Society and culture

The Ancient Greek book The Characters of Theophrastus devotes a chapter to "The Boastful Man".

Bēot is Old English for a ritualized boast, vow, threat or promise, which was usually made by an Anglo-Saxon warrior on the eve of or during battle. Bēots can be found in the epic poem Beowulf, including by the hero himself.

A gab (Old Occitan [ˈɡap] for "boast") is a troubadour boasting song.

Boasting and bragging are necessary components of maintaining "face" in some Arab societies.

Fictional characters noted for their boasting

 Miles Gloriosus, a stock character from ancient Roman comedy
 Rodomonte, a major character in the Italian romantic epic poems Orlando innamorato by Matteo Maria Boiardo and Orlando furioso by Ludovico Ariosto, which gave rise to the word rodomontade, meaning "boastful, bragging talk"
 Scaramouche, a stock clown character in Italian commedia dell'arte
 Falstaff, in three of William Shakespeare's plays
 Baron Munchausen, a baron made famous by the novel of Rudolf Raspe who enjoys telling fantastical and absurd stories about his adventures abroad. He was based on a real-life German baron who was known for his exaggerated tales.
 The Twelve Idle Servants, a fairy tale by The Brothers Grimm about twelve servants who boast about their incredible laziness.
 Daffy Duck: American cartoon character who often brags about himself. In all of the cartoons he appeared in since the 1950s, he is usually victim of his own overestimations.
 Lambik: A Belgian comics character who often sees himself as smart, strong, attractive and a born leader, but is actually neither of those things.
 Odd Della Robbia, one of the main characters of the French animated series Code Lyoko.

See also

References

Morality
Self